Sari (also romanized as Sārī), also known as Shahr-e-Tajan and Shari-e-Tajan, is the provincial capital of Mazandaran Province and former capital of Iran (for a short period), located in the north of Iran, between the northern slopes of the Alborz Mountains and southern coast of the Caspian Sea. Sari is the largest and most populous city of Mazandaran.

Geography
The coastline north of Sari fronts onto the Mazandaran Sea; north-east of the city lies Neka.
Qa'emshahr (formerly known as Shahi) is to its south-west, Juybar is to its north-west,
and Kiasar, Damghan, and Semnan are cities located to the south.

Climate
Sari has a humid subtropical climate (Köppen: Cfa, Trewartha: Cf) that borders on a Mediterranean climate (Csa). Winters are cool and rainy whilst summers are hot and humid. Sari's 2005–2006 statistical weather information, in comparison with that of other Mazandaran cities, shows that Sari has an average climate, but it is somewhat sunnier and has more spring rain. However, recent rainfall in Sari has declined.

History

Early history
Excavations in the Hutto cave present evidence for the existence of settlements around Sari as far back as the 70th millennium BCE.
The Muslim historian Hamdollah Mostowfi attributes the foundation of Sari to king Tahmoures Divband of the Pishdadian Dynasty. Ferdowsi mentions the name of the city in Shahnameh, at the time of Fereydun and Manuchehr, when Manuchehr is returning to Fereydun's capital, Tamisheh in Mazandaran, after the victory over Salm and Tur:

the city's name was also Zadracarta in 658 B.C to 225 A.D.

Coming from this and other similar evidence in the Shahnameh, native people of Sari have a folklore that the city was populated when the blacksmith Kaveh (a native of the city) revolted against the tyranny of Zahak. After that success, Fereydun of Pishdadi (from Tamishan) feeling indebted to Kaveh, chose this city so as to live near him until his death. For this reason, when Touraj and Salam murdered Iraj (son of Fereydun), they buried him here.
Espahbod Tous-e Nouzar (great-grandson of Fereydun) systematically founded it to remain as family monument. Sari may be synonymous with the city of Zadracarta (Persian: Sadrakarta) mentioned by Ancient Greek sources as early as the 6th century BCE (Achaemenid dynasty). However, other sources suggest that modern Gorgan is located closer to, or on, the site of Zadracarta.

According to Arrian, this was the largest city of Hyrcania. The term means "the yellow city" and it was given to it because of the great number of orange, lemon, and other fruit trees that grew in the outskirts of that city. Hence it is by D'Anville, Rochette, and other geographers, identified Saru, which Pietro Della Valle says in his "Travels" means "the yellow city". It is probable that Zadracarta and Saru are the same with the Syringis of Polybius, taken from Arsaces II by Antiochus the Great, in his vain attempt to reunite the revolted provinces of Hyrcania and Parthia to the Syrian crown. Han Way, who visited Saru in 1734, makes mention of four ancient Magian temples as still standing then, built in the form of several rotundas, each thirty feet in diameter, and about 120 in height. However Sir William Ouseley, who had travelled to the site in 1811, has speculated that these to be masses of brick masonry of the Mohammedan age. Out of four, one of the rotunda is still standing since the rest were overturned by an earthquake. This and other remains of similar buildings, bear the names of Fereydun, Salm, Tur, and other mythical figures, whose celebrity had been established about 2000 years prior to their erection. One of them Avas called the tomb of Kaus, and was supposed to contain the ashes of Cyrus the Great. Sir William Ouseley thinks it was that of Kabus, or Kaus, the son of Washmakin, who governed Mazanderan in the fourth century of the Hejira. It was at Saru that the ashes of the youthful hero, Sohraub, were deposited by his father, Roostum, after he had unwittingly slayed Sohrab in a hand-to-hand battle. Saru is celebrated for its abundance of gardens, which emit a pleasing fragrance in the vernal and summer months. An oriental proverb declares that the "gates of paradise derive sweetness from the air of Sari and the flowers of Eden receive their fragrance from its soil". The city was again a regional capital in the Sassanid dynasty era.

Capital of Tabaristan local rulers 
In the seventh century, Farrukhan the Great of the Dabuyid dynasty reconstructed the city, and because his son's name was "Saruyeh", he called it by this name. Sari once again became the capital of Tabaristan during that century (Amol was the capital previously ).

After invasions by the successors of Mongols, Timur of Uzbeks, Turcoman, and Tatars the city lost its high status and was periodically burnt to ashes.

Safavid-Qajar era
Because Shah Abbas I's mother was from Behshahr (Ashraf), he founded Farahabad as his alternate capital of Persia in the north of the city and created the gardens in Ashraf. Mazandaran alongside neighboring Gilan were subsequently settled during Abbas' reign by large numbers of Georgians, Circassians, Armenians and other peoples of the Caucasus, whose descendants still live across Mazandaran. Still many towns, villages and neighbourhoods in Mazandaran bear the name "Gorji" (i.e. Georgian) in them, although most of the Georgians are already assimilated into the mainstream Mazanderanis.
After the Safavid dynasty fell and until the rise of Agha Mohammad Khan to power there, is no evidence of any notable events in Sari.

Early 20th century
Major developments took place after the Qajar dynasty. During the reign of Reza Shah Pahlavi, the face of the town was changed drastically. Sari Rail Station and most of the streets and governmental buildings date from that era. During World War II the Soviet army occupied the city, but left it after the war.

About Sari

The Clock Tower, in the Clock Square (Meydan-e-Sa'at) located in downtown Sari, attracts visitors and has become a local landmark. Sari also contains the tombs of the Muslim cleric leaders Yahya and Zayn Al-Abedin, Emamzade-ye Abbas, and Shazdeh Hussein the architecture of which are from the 15th century.

Economy
The economy of Sari is based on food production such as milled rice, dairy products, canned meat and cookies. Sari is a major citrus fruits producer, especially oranges, tangerines and lemons. Oil seeds such as soybean and grape being cultivated in vast lands around villages for producing of vegetable ghee and cooking oil. During the 1950s to 1970s, a factory of MM company was the city's largest industrial complex and one of the country's biggest vegetable oil producers. After the 1979 revolution, the company was nationalized but got bankrupt and closed later on. Other sources of the economy include, but are not limited to, paper, wood, fabrics and construction materials. Mazandaran Wood and Paper Industries, the biggest factory of its kind in the middle east, is situated in a 2000-acre ground on Semnan Road. Mazpaper is presently producing more than 20% of country's paper requirements and is a major economical entity not only for the city but also for the province. The MWPI's major subsidiary is the NEKA CHOUB Co., that is manufacturing plywood and chipboard.

The city is served by Refah Chain Stores Co., Iran Hyper Star, Isfahan City Center, Shahrvand Chain Stores Inc., Ofoq Kourosh chain store.

City districts

Sari's major districts are: 
Mirzazamani, Azad Goleh, Bagher Abad, Booali & Posht-e-Hotel (both located in Pasdaran Blvd.), Barbari Mahalleh, Bazaar-e Nargesiyeh,
Bazaar-e Rooz, Chenar-Bon, Gol-Afshan, Golma, Kooy-e Azadi,
Kooy-e DadGostari, Kooy-e Daneshgah, Kooy-e Djahad, Kooy-e
Golha, Kooy-e-Karmandan, Kooy-e Mahyar, Kooy-e MirSarorozeh,
Kooy-e Qelich, Lesani, Mehdi-Abad, Na'l-Bandan,
No-Tekiyeh, Peyvandi, Pir Tekiyeh, Pol-e Gardan, Posht-e Nim-e
Shaban, Posht-e Zendan, Rahband-e Dokhaniyat, Dokhaniyat, Kooy-e Etehad, Rahband-e
Sangtarashan, Sang, Sari Kenar, Sarvineh Bagh, Seyyed AlShohada,
Shafa, Shahband, Shazdeh Hossein, Shekar Abad, Tabarestan,
Tavakkoli, Torki Mahalleh, Torkmen Mahalleh, etc.

Previous districts
Sari's old city structure changed in the first Pahlavi era. New avenues and streets in the city center date from that period. In the Qajar dynasty, Sari's neighborhoods included:
Afghoun Mahalleh, Bahar Abad, Balouchi Kheyl, Balouchi
Mahalleh, Birameter (Bahram-Ottor), Chaleh Bagh, Dar Masdjed,
Isfahouni Mahalleh, Kohneh Baq Shah, Kurd Mahalleh, Mir Mashad Mahalleh, Mir Sar Rozeh, Na'l Bandan, Naqareh Khaneh, Ossanlou Mahalleh, Paay-e Chenar, QelichLi Mahalleh, Sabzeh Meydan, Shazdeh Hossein, Shepesh Koshan, Shishehgar Mahalleh.

Population
The population density of some neighborhoods in downtown (for example: Mirzazamani, Peyvandi, Sang) is greater than 20,000 per square kilometer. Note that before 1950, the population of the city during the summer was less than in winter. This influenced estimations, such that an estimate done in summer might be inaccurate. 

 1808 = 21,000 est.
 1827 = 19,000 est.
 1832 = 20,000 est.
 1850 = 15,000 est.
 1856 = 9,000 est.
 1872 = 15,500 est.
 1874 = 16,000 est.
 1883 = 16,100 est.
 1905 = 25,000 est.
 1923 = 35,000 est.
 1956 = 26,278 cen.
 1966 = 44,547 cen.
 1976 = 70,753 cen.
 1986 = 141,020 cen.
 1996 = 195,882 cen.
 2006 = 262,627 est.
 2008 = 300,000 est.
 2011 = 478,370 est.
 2013 = 296,417 exact
 2016 = 504,298 exact

People and culture
Most Sari people speak the Mazandarani language Tabari as a mother tongue; however, Persian is the most common language spoken in Iran and the lingua franca.

Zoroastrians from Sari who fled to India in the 10th century founded there a city which they named "Navu Sari" (English: "New Sari"), a name which was by now shortened to Navsari; the town is still a center of the Zoroastrian Parsi community of India.

Transport

Arriving

By air
Sari is served by Dasht-e Naz International Airport, which is located in the north-eastern part of the city. List of arrival and departure flights can be found in the Airport's website.

By train
The city is connected to Gorgan and Tehran by the Shomal Railway route. That is a major branch of Iran's Railroad.

By boat
The port of Amir Abad is located on the southern coast of the Caspian Sea.

By car
Local highways have been well developed after the Iran–Iraq War. The Sari area is served with the No. 62W Freeway.

By bus
There are five bus terminals, but one, Terminal-e Dowlat, is the most used. The others serve cities that are located within 150 kilometers from Sari: Gorgan, Nowshahr, Chaloos, and Kiyasar are within this range.

* indicates that destination is actually nearer than the figure shown

Getting around
The layout of the city renders occasional use of taxis. There is a wide choice of taxi systems including limousines, wireless radio taxis, airport or rail station taxis, and telephone taxis. City buses are also common because they connect Sari's suburbs to the center of city, providing a low cost and convenient means of transportation to and from the town for people living in those neighborhoods. Although Sari is considered a safe city for pedestrians even at night, nevertheless care should be taken when walking around.

Outdoors
Places of interest in the area include:
 Farah Abad Coast
 Gohar Baran Coast
 Dehkadeh Aramesh Tourist Village
 Tajan River Park
 Melal park
 Zare' Forest Park
 Salardareh Forest Park
 Dasht-E-Naaz National Park
 Pol-e-Gardan hiking trail
 Nemashoun Lake
 Lak-Dasht Lake
 Soleyman-Tangeh Lake
 Bam-e-Shahr Hill (Offers a great panoramic view of the city)
 Qor-Maraz (Natural spa, Neka)
 Jamaloddin kola (Damaneh kohe shahdezh)

Colleges and universities
In the course of history, Sari was once one of the most cultured cities in the history of Iran. The scientific knowledge of Saravis were noted throughout history and recorded by Pietro Della Valle and other visitors. Today, the universities are as follows:
 University of Agricultural Science and Natural Resources
 Mazandaran University of Medical Sciences (MazUMS) 
 University of Natural Science
 Islamic Azad University of Sari
 Imam Mohammad Bagher University of Technology
 Sarian University of Art & Architecture
 Payam-e-Noor University
 University of Tech & Engineering (Khalil Moqadam)
 University of Tarbiyat-e Moallem
 Sama Technology Faculty of Azad University
 Rouzbehan University
 Science and Research Branch Islamic azad university
 Hadaf University

Sports facilities
Many sport complexes are in Sari, including:
Jahan-Pahlavan Takhti Sports Complex, located on Farhang Street;
Hashemi-Nassab Sports Complex, located on the railway side of the autobahn;
Montazeri Sports complex, located in Shahband neighborhood.

Sari's Mottaqi football stadium is one of the oldest sports field in the country but nowadays it is seldom used in major soccer matches.

Wrestling
Sari is the birthplace of several wrestlers and athletes. Notable wrestlers from Sari include Asgari Mohammadian, Majid Torkan and Morad Mohammadi. The town was the host and scene of 2006 Wrestling World Cup Competitions.

Cultural attractions

Although Sari is the most important cultural place in the north of Iran, earthquakes and other causes destroyed most of its cultural heritage and ancient monuments. Still, Sari has been described as Safa City (City of Curvet). Notable are Famous Houses such as Kolbadi House and Amir Divan House (Ramedani House); also the Resket Tower from the House of Karen era and the Farahabad Palace Complex from the Safavid era and historical Sari Central Mosque and tomb tower Imamzadeh Abbas.

Arts and culture
Khosrow Sinai (born 19 January 1941 in Sari) a renowned film director of the country was the first Iranian film director to win an international prize after the Islamic revolution in Iran. He is also known as an Iranian scholar and has been awarded the prestigious Knight's Cross of the Order of Merit of the Republic of Poland.

Music
Seyed Abdolhossein Mokhtabad-Amrei (born 1966 in Sari) is an Iranian composer and singer of Persian Classical music.
He received his vocal training under supervision of renowned and legendary maestros and since his professional debut inاارا 1991, has performed numerous concerts in Iran and abroad, including most European Countries, South East Asia and Northern America "Canada & United States" and produced more than 20 sets of music albums.

Authors and poets
Sari has raised many authors and poets. Mina Assadi is probably the most famous one. She was born and raised in Sari but then moved to Teheran to study journalism and work as a journalist at newspapers like Kayhan. Today Mina Assadi lives in exile in Stockholm, Sweden.
Mohsen Emadi (born 29 October 1976 in Sari) is another Persian poet and translator.

Religious sites

 Emamzadeh Yahya (son of Imam Moosa-ibn Jafar)
 Emamzadeh Abbas (son of Imam Moosa-ibn Jafar)
 Emamzadeh Abdollah, Koula
 Masjed-e-Jaame' Mosque (constructed before Islam by Zoroastrians, where many important kings and heroes of Persia such as Iraj, Tur, Salm, Fereydun, Sohrab (son of Rostam) that Ferdowsi recalls them in shahnameh are buried near this place).
 Emam-Sajjad Mosque (formerly Shah-Qazi, initially was called Marqad-'Ala-Adolleh School but Rostam Shah Qazi reconstructed it in 1169 and renamed it to Shah-Qazi during the Qaznavi era)
 Haaj Mostafa Khan Mosque (Sourteci)
 Reza Khan Mosque (Hozeh Elmiyeh)
 Molla-Majd-Addin Place
 Shazdeh-Hossein Place
 Pahneh-Kalla Place

Notable people

 Mohammad Salih al-Mazandarani (1086) - author
 Ibn Shahr Ashub - medieval jurist 
 Farrukhan the Great - king
 Ali-Akbar Davar (1867-1937) - politician
 Ehsanollah Khan Dustdar (1884-1939) - politician
 Hossein Ghods-Nakhai (1911-1977) - diplomat
 Ehsan Tabari (1917-1989) - politician
 Al-Marzuban - author
 Javad Saeed (1924-1979) - politician
 Hassan Rahnavardi (b. 1927) - weightlifter and physician
 Khosrow Sinai (b. 1940) - film director
 Mohammad Donyavi (b. 1942) - singer and musician
 Mina Assadi (b. 1943) - poet
 Reza Allamehzadeh (b. 1943) - film director
 Elaheh Koulaei (b. 1956) - politician
 Hossein Mesgar Saravi (b. 1957) - football player
 Maryam Mojtahedzadeh (b. 1957) - nurse educator
 Ali Kordan (1958-2009) - politician
 Askari Mohammadian (b. 1963) - wrestler
 Farshid Moussavi (b. 1965) - architect
 Majid Torkan (b. 1965) - wrestler
 Abdolhossein Mokhtabad (b. 1966) - singer
 Zinat Pirzadeh (b. 1967) - actress, writer, comedian
 Ali Nazari Juybari (b. 1967) - football administrator
 Seyed Abolhassan Mokhtabad (b. 1970) - journalist
 Mohsen Emadi (b. 1976) - poet
 Ebrahim Taghipour (b. 1976) - football player
 Saba Kamali (b. 1976) - actor
 Morad Mohammadi (b. 1980) - wrestler
 Mohammad Taghavi (b. 1980) - football coach
 Behdad Esfahbod (b. 1982) - software engineer
 Sam Dastyari (b. 1983) - Australian politician
 Hossein Rajabian (b. 1984) - Filmmaker- Photographer- Writer
 Rouhollah Arab (b. 1984) - football player
 Sheys Rezaei (b. 1984) - football player
 Mehdi Momeni (b. 1985) - football player
 Abbas Dabbaghi (b. 1987) - wrestler
 Mohammad Reza Barari (b. 1988) - weightlifter
 Taha Mortazavi (b. 1988) - futsal player
 Mehdi Rajabian (b. 1989) - singer
 Mohammad Abbaszadeh (b. 1990) - football player
 Ramin Rezaeian (b. 1991) - football player
 Omid Alishah (b. 1992) - football player
 Mohammad Hossein Mohammadian (b. 1992) - wrestler
 Mohsen Karimi (b. 1994) - football player
 Behdad Esfahbod (b. 1982) - software engineer

Sister cities
  Najaf
  Gomel
  Astrakhan
  Ancona
  Mezdeh

See also
Nav Sari (New Sari), city in Gujarat, India, traditionally named so by Parsis

Notes

References
 About Sari, Author: Dr. Hussein Eslami, Year: 1995, Special Municipal Research & Cultural Center for Sari
 Sari, My Lovely City, Author: Ali Hessami, Year: 2006, 23965 Sari Primary Library

External links

 Sārī in Encyclopædia Britannica

 
Cities in Mazandaran Province
Iranian provincial capitals

Populated places on the Caspian Sea
Populated coastal places in Iran
Archaeological sites in Iran
Former capitals of Iran